Josip Knežević (born 3 October 1988) is a Croatian international footballer who plays for Croatian club Šibenik.

Playing career

Club
Knežević has started his career in senior professional team of NK Osijek on 2005/2006 at the age of 17. He has regularly played for Croatian national team U-18, U-19, U-20 and U-21, has total 13 caps in Croatian national team for young players. Now, Josip Knežević is an active member of the Croatian national under-21 team. This season 2008/2009 he is actually second on the list of assists of Croatian Championship Prva HNL with 7 assists.

On 12 February 2010 Knežević moved to Russian side Amkar Perm in a deal initially worth €500,000. Two years later, in January 2012, Knežević signed a season-long loan deal with Kazakhstan Premier League outfit FC Kairat. After an impressive start, in which he scored 3 goals in 5 appearances, Knežević suffered a mid-season injury, but still ended up as the teams topscorer with 6 goals (3 - pen.). 
At the end of Kneževićs loan deal he returned to Amkar Perm, before signing a permanent three-year contract with FC Kairat in February 2013.

After six-months without a team, Knežević signed a six-month contract with FC Kaisar.

International
Knežević is former youth international player for the Croatian U21, U19 and U17 sides.

Career statistics

Club statistics

Updated to games played as of 15 May 2021.

References

External links
 

1988 births
Living people
Footballers from Osijek
Association football midfielders
Croatian footballers
Croatia youth international footballers
Croatia under-21 international footballers
NK Osijek players
FC Amkar Perm players
FC Kairat players
FC Kaisar players
Puskás Akadémia FC players
Al-Arabi SC (Kuwait) players
Croatian Football League players
Russian Premier League players
Kazakhstan Premier League players
Nemzeti Bajnokság I players
Kuwait Premier League players
Croatian expatriate footballers
Expatriate footballers in Russia
Expatriate footballers in Kazakhstan
Expatriate footballers in Kuwait
Expatriate footballers in Hungary
Croatian expatriate sportspeople in Russia
Croatian expatriate sportspeople in Hungary
Croatian expatriate sportspeople in Kazakhstan
Croatian expatriate sportspeople in Kuwait